The 2022–23 Austrian Football Second League  known as the Admiral 2nd League for sponsorship purposes, is the 49th season of the Austrian second-level football league and the fifth as the Second League. The league consists of 16 teams.

Teams
Sixteen teams will participate in the 2022–23 season. FC Flyeralarm Admira was relegated from the 2021–22 Austrian Football Bundesliga, replacing the 2021-22 Champions SC Austria Lustenau, while First Vienna FC (Regionalliga Ost) and SK Sturm Graz II (Regionalliga Mitte) were promoted from the third tier to replace the two relegated squads, FC Juniors OÖ and FC Wacker Innsbruck.

League table

Results

Positions by round

Placement Progression

Results by round

Season statistics

Top scorers

See also
 2022–23 Austrian Football Bundesliga
 2022–23 Austrian Cup

References

External links
 Official website 
 Page on AustriaSoccer.at 

2. Liga (Austria) seasons
2022–23 in Austrian football
Aus
Current association football seasons